The 2006 Shepherd Rams football team represented Shepherd University during the 2006 NCAA Division II football season as a member of the West Virginia Intercollegiate Athletic Conference (WVIAC). They were led by head coach Monte Cater, in his 20th season at Shepherd, and finished the season 11–1. With a conference record of 7–0, they were named WVIAC champions and advanced to the Division II Playoffs, losing in the quarterfinal round against Bloomsburg.

The Rams played their home games at Ram Stadium in Shepherdstown, West Virginia.

Preseason
The Rams entered the 2006 season as the 16th ranked team in the country.

Regular season
The 2006 regular season for the Rams consisted of 7 games against WVIAC opponents, and one game each against Millersville, Shippensburg, and C.W. Post. The Rams went undefeated in the regular season and were given the top seed in Super Region I in the 2006 NCAA Division II football playoffs.

With their win over West Liberty on November 4, Shepherd clinched the WVIAC title.

Playoffs
Shepherd received a first round bye in the playoffs by way of earning the #1 seed in Super Region I. In the second round, the team hosted Merrimack, and won the game 31–7, before losing in the quarterfinals against Bloomsburg.

Schedule

References

Shepherd
Shepherd Rams football seasons
Shepherd Rams football